Liugaizi is a town in Linqing, Liaocheng, in western Shandong province, China.  it had 35 villages under its administration:
Liugaizi Village
Liangzhuang Village
Salipu Village
Baifosi Village
Zhangzhuang Village
Beixue Village
Jiangyoufang Village
Songzhuang Village
Jiushengmiao Village
Wangmiao Village
Zhulou Village
Yinzhuang Village
Yinge Village
Zhaojuan Village
Liaozhuang Village
Lütang Village
Houli Village
Wafang Village
Zuoqiao Village
Yangxinzhuang Village
Jingzhuang Village
Yuzhuang Village
Xuzhuang Village
Beiliu Village
Haozhuang Village
Mazhuang Village
Kongji Village
Kongzhuang Village
Shizhuang Village
Nanxue Village
Nanliu Village
Xuelou Village
Luzhuang Village
Nieyuan Village
Jiangzhuang Village

References

Township-level divisions of Shandong
Linqing